The Long March 1D was a member of China's Long March rocket family. During the 1990s CALT developed an improved version of the DF-4 to test the reentry vehicle warheads of the DF-31. They took advantage of this development and offered it as the Long March 1D for commercial application. The modifications included:
 An DF-4 improved first stage, which used the new version of the YF-2B, and switched propellants to UDMH/N2O4 for improved performance.
 The replacement of the DF-4 second stage motor YF-3A. The proposed replacement was the Long March 4 third stage engine, the YF-40.
 A new inline inter-stage would replace the existing tapered connector between the second and third stages, which allowed for an additional 70cm diameter to be added to the third stage skirt. This would allow for the addition of RCS to the third stage.
 A new third stage with a new motor, the FG-36 and an optional RCS.
 A new computer inertial guidance system which enabled the third stage to be 3-axis stabilised for added precision.

The new design did not have a good reception and was only used for reentry vehicle tests. It flew three suborbital missions from Taiyuan LC-1 with two successes and a failure on the final mission. The first launch was on June 1, 1995 and the second one was in November 1997. The final and failed launch was on January 3, 2002.

References
 Data from Aerospace China magazine

External links 

 China Academy of Launch Vehicle Technology

Long March (rocket family)
Vehicles introduced in 1995